The Reunion Show was a pop-punk American band from Long Island, New York. They released one album on Victory Records before three members of the group moved on to form Action Action.

History
The group formed from members of Step Lively, the Waiting Process, and Edna's Goldfish in 2000, and soon after began touring the United States. They released an EP in 2002 and signed to Victory Records a few months later. Their debut full-length, Kill Your Television, arrived late that year. The band toured with Taking Back Sunday before they were signed with Victory Records. In the summer of 2003 guitarist Sherman and bassist Diaz left the group and were replaced by two former members of Count the Stars, Adam Manning and Clarke Foley. However, the lineup did not last long; the group broke up and three members went on to form the Victory Records band Action Action. Derrick Sherman now plays lead guitar and does backup vocals in Long Island band, Sainthood Reps.

Members
Mark Thomas - vocals, guitar, keyboards (2000-2004)
Skully - drums (2000-2004)
Derrick Sherman - guitar (2000-2003)
Brian Diaz - bass, vocals (2000-2003)
Adam Manning - guitar (2003-2004)
Clarke Foley - bass (2003-2004)

Discography
The Motion EP (Law of Inertia Records, 2002)
Kill Your Television (Victory Records, 2002)

References

Pop punk groups from New York (state)
Musical groups from Long Island
Victory Records artists